is a 2014 Japanese drama film directed by Yuya Ishii.

Cast 
 Satoshi Tsumabuki - Kosuke Wakana
 Sosuke Ikematsu - Kousuke Wakana
 Mieko Harada - Reiko Wakana
 Kyōzō Nagatsuka - Katsuaki Wakana

References

External links 

2014 drama films
Films directed by Yuya Ishii
Japanese drama films
2010s Japanese films